Yuli is a 2018 Peruvian science fiction action film written and directed by Christian Carrasco in his directorial debut. It stars Marisela Puicón and Julián Legaspi. It premiered on October 11, 2018, in Peruvian theaters.

Synopsis 
Yuli desperately observes on her bed the corpse that hours before had been her client, not knowing that under it is hidden a suitcase full of dollars that would be the salvation of her only daughter, victim of a serious illness. Hours go by and mafia hitmen already know their location and go after the loot. Sony, Yuli's unconditional friend, responds to her call, unaware of the dangers that await her... Yuli knows that only a great power can free her from death. Now it's just a matter of who will get there first.

Cast 
The actors participating in this film are:

 Marisela Puicón as Yuli
 Julián Legaspi as Cyborg
 Giovanna Valcárcel as Sony
 Jorge ‘Coco’ Gutiérrez
 Alexander Geks
 Aaron Alejandro Silverstone
 Alan Castillo
 Gustavo Cerrón
 Fernanda Pacheco
 Daniel Ceron
 Luis Rodríguez

Production 
Filming took place on locations in Lima and the Villa swamps in the summer of 2017. Post-production was done in Argentina and Indonesia.

Reception 
Yuli attracted 5,836 viewers throughout its run in Peruvian theaters.

Future 
Before the film's premiere, Christian Carrasco revealed that he was planning 2 sequels, with the script for both parts complete.

References 

2018 films
2018 science fiction action films
Peruvian science fiction films
Peruvian action films
Peruvian crime films
2010s Spanish-language films
2010s Peruvian films
Films set in Peru
Films shot in Peru
Films about prostitution
Films about criminals
2018 directorial debut films